Thoubal district (Meitei pronunciation:/ˈθɑʊbɑːl orˈθɑʊbəl/) is one of the sixteen districts of Manipur state in northeastern India. This district is bounded by Senapati district on the north, Ukhrul and Chandel districts on the east, Churchandpur and Bishnupur districts on the south and Imphal West and Imphal East districts on the west. The district occupies an area of 324 km2. The population as of 2011 is 286,687. Thoubal town is the district headquarters. This district is known for Khongjom, where the last battle of the independence of Manipur was fought in April 1891 against the British army.

History
In May 1983 this district came into existence when Thoubal sub-division of the erstwhile Manipur Central District (later Imphal district) with all its administrative units was transferred to form a new district. Later, in November 1983, Thoubal district was divided into Thoubal and Kakching sub-divisions comprising Kakching and Waikhong Tahsils. At present there are 3 sub divisions in Thoubal district, they are Thoubal, Lilong and Kakching.

Geography
The district occupies the larger part of the eastern half of the Manipur Valley. The shape of the district is an irregular triangle with its base facing north. It lies between 23° 45' – 24° 45' North latitudes and 93° 45' – 94° 15' East longitudes. Its average elevation is about 790 m above the sea level. The district is dotted by a few hillocks and hills of low heights. Of these, Punam hill has an elevation of 1009 m above the sea level.

Rivers and lakes
The Imphal and the Thoubal are the most significant rivers that flow through the district. The Thoubal River originates in the hill ranges of Ukhrul and is an important tributary of the Imphal River. It passes through Yairipok and Thoubal before joining the Imphal at Irong near Mayang Imphal. The Imphal River rises in the hills of Senapati district and flows south. It forms the northern and western boundaries of Thoubal district. Other rivers in the district are the Wangjing, the Arong and the Sekmai. These rivers originate in the hills of Ukhrul district. The Arong River flows through Khangabok and falls into Kharung Pat. The Wangjing River flows west via Heirok and Wangjing before joining the Loushi Pat.

The southwestern part of the district is a part of the Loktak Lake region and this area has a number of shallow and rain fed lakes, the important ones being Kharung, Ikop, Pumlen, Lousi and Ngangou. The Waithou Lake in the northern part of the district is formed by the drainage waters collected between Waithou hill on the west and the villages and paddy fields on the east.

Climate
The district has a moderate climate with relatively abundant and widespread rainfall. The rainy season starts in June and continue till September. Intermittent rains continue till October. The winter season lasts from December to February. During the winter months light rainfall occurs under the influence of the northeast monsoon. The average minimum temperature during winter is 4–6 °C, sometimes the minimum temperature goes below 0 °C. April and May are the summer season. The average maximum temperature is 32–35 °C during these months, seldom the maximum temperature goes beyond 37 °C. Occasional thunderstorms occur during these months. The average annual rainfall was 1318.39 mm during the period 1983–89.

Economy

Agriculture is the most important source of livelihood for the people of this district of Manipur. More than 70 per cent of the total population of the district is directly or indirectly engaged in agricultural activities. The valley is fertile and the topography of Thoubal District provides good opportunity for irrigation, natural as well as artificial. Rice accounts for above 90 per cent of the total land area under cultivation. The soil of the district is fertile and with the help of irrigation facilities from the Imphal barrage double cropping is widely practiced in the district.
In some areas, even triple cropping is practiced - first paddy crop starting late February or early March, second paddy crop in July and early August and the third crop of mustard seeds, pulses, etc. in November. Other crops grown in Thoubal District are sugarcane, oilseeds, maize, potatoes, pulses, chilies, etc. The district is the largest producer of sugarcane in Manipur. Its cultivation is mainly confined to Thoubal, Wangjing, Kakching, Kakching Khunou and Wabagai. Although maize is grown throughout the district, it is cultivated as major cash crop around Serou, Pallel and Kakching belt. Oilseeds, mainly mustard seeds, are found all over the district. Recently cultivation of sunflower has also started. Vegetables such as cabbages, cauliflower, different kinds of peas, gourds, pumpkins, etc. are cultivated here. Among the plantation crops, pineapples are the most important and are cultivated in the slopes of low hills and hillocks it is Mainly cultivated in Waithou hill range and Sharam hill. 
Another important sector of economy of Thoubal District is Animal Husbandry. Important livestock found in Thoubal District are cattle, buffaloes, goats, horses and ponies, pigs, dogs etc. Significant progress have been made in the district in the direction of milk production, breeding of better varieties of cattle and poultry, and generation of employment through piggery and poultry development. Recently a dairy production firm is planning to open in Khangabok.
Khangabok is famed throughout Manipur for Tule, (Schoenoplectus acutus) know locally as Kouna, based handicrafts too. Kouna is used for making seating mat (phak), stool (mora), chair, mattress and various other crafts.

Fishing also contributes to the economy of Thoubal District. Fishing provides an important occupation for a large number of people in the district. Fishing is commonly practiced in villages such as Tentha, Leishangthem, Wabgai, Khangabok, Kakching-khunou and Wangoo.

Tourism

Khongjom

It is situated above 10 km to the south of Thoubal, the district headquarters (32 km from Imphal).  It is the place where last war of Manipur's independence was fought between the Manipuri and the British soldiers. Khongjom war memorial park has been constructed and on the top Kheba hillock statue of Paona brajabashi is erected. Every year on 23 April Khongjom day is celebrated.

Sugnu
Situated 51 km from Thoubal and junction of four districts i.e. Thoubal, Bishnupur, Churachandpur and Chandel, the place is an important trading centre on the south of the district. From it, views of the Imphal river can be seen. It is on the Imphal–Sugnu State highway. Serou temple near Sugnu is one of the famous pilgrims in Manipur.

Waithou

The place is important for its scenery. There is an inspection bungalow on the hill-side over looking the Waithou Lake. The place is noted for its tasty pineapples. An exotic variety of local fish known as 'Ngaton' used to be available at this place abundantly till a few years back from now. It is on the National highway about 3 km from the district headquarters.

Thoubal
It is the district headquarters of Thoubal district and also the sub-divisional headquarters of Thoubal sub-division. It is the largest and busiest town of this district.  Situated 22 km from Imphal, the National highway No. 39 divides the town almost into halves from north to south length-wise. The Thoubal river flows through the centre of the town from east to west. It is the biggest town in the district and is one of the most important trading centre of the district. The town has all the infrastructures of a fast developing urban area. All the government offices, institutions and banks of this district are located around Thoubal town.

Demographics
According to the 2011 census Thoubal district has a population of 422,168 roughly equal to the nation of Malta. This gives it a ranking of 555th in India (out of a total of 640). Its population growth rate over the decade 2001–2011 was 15.48%. Thoubal has a sex ratio of 1006 females for every 1000 males, and a literacy rate of 76.66%.

Languages

Transports
Transports system in this district is good. All the important towns and villages are well connected with district headquarters and other sub-divisional headquarters. There are regular taxis playing between Thoubal to Kakching and other places.

Roads
As the Asian highway AH-1 passes through the center of the district the road connection in this district is good. Most of the important towns in this district are connected with this highway. The other important state highways in this district are Mayai-lambi road, Indo-Burma-Sugunu road and Imphal Yairipok road etc. Other important district roads are Thoubal-Leishangthem-Mayang Imphal road, Thoubal-yairipok-Sekhong sekmai road, Wangjing-Heirok-Machi road, Wangjing-tentha-Wabgai road, Khangabok-Sangaiyumpham-Tentha road, Kakching-Machi road, Pallel-Chandel road, Sugunu-Saikot-Lamka road, Sugunu-Serou-CH.karong road.

Education

Thoubal and Kakching are the main educational hubs of the district. Thoubal College and Kha-Manipur College are degree colleges in the district. Beside this many other colleges are in the district. A nursing college inside the district hospital Thoubal has been under construction. Jawaharlal Novodya vidyalaya kakching-khunou is the only central government school in this district and other schools are Padhma-Ratna school Kakching, K.M blooming Eng. School Khangabok, Evergreen Flower Eng. school Thoubal.

Health
Hospitals in Thoubal are:-
 Thoubal District Hospital Khangabok
 Jivan Hospital (private) Kakching
 Yoga & Nature Cure Research Hospital Kakching

Administrative divisions

The district is divided into 2 sub-divisions:
 Thoubal
 Lilong

Recently, Kakching is carved out from Thoubal district as a separate district comprising the sub-divisions of Kakching and Waikhong.

The 10 Vidhan Sabha constituencies located within the undivided district are: Lilong, Thoubal, Wangkhem, Heirok, Wangjing-Tentha, Khangabok, Wabagai, Kakching, Hiyanglam, and Sugnu.

Thoubal and Kakching are the municipal towns and Lilong, Wangjing, Yairipok, Waikhong, Hiyanglam, and Sugnu are other small town in the undivided district.

Important offices in Thoubal District
 Deputy commissioner office Thoubal Athokpam 
 District Road transport office Thoubal Athokpam
 Mini Secretariat complex Thoubal Athokpam 
 District Hospital Khangabok 
 Telephone Exchange BSNL Khangabok
 District Fishery Research Centre Khangabok
 District Superintendent of Police Headquarters Khangabok
 District Civil Court Khangabok

 District Rice Research Center Khangabok
 District Sericulture Research Center Khangabok
 Food Corporation of India Khangabok
 Zonal Education Office Thoubal
 Public Works Department Thoubal	
 Public Health Engineering Department Thoubal
 BSNL office Kakching
 LIC office Kakching

Banks in Thoubal district
 SBI Thoubal Athokpam.
 SBI Kakching 
 SBI Lilong
 SBI Wangjing
 SBI Yairipok
 UNITED BANK OF INDIA -Thoubal 
 UNITED BANK OF INDIA- Kakching
 INDIAN OVERSEAS BANK - Thoubal
 HDFC BANK Thoubal Athokpam.
 ICICI BANK, NEAR D.C. OFFICE, Thoubal Athokpam.
 MSCD Bank Thoubal
 BOI Thoubal Achouba

Areas under Imphal Urban Agglomeration
 Lilong

Sports Ground
List of Sports ground in Thoubal are:-
 Thoubal District Table Tennis Indoor stadium Thoubal
 BASU ground Khangabok
 Kodompokpi Football Stadium Wangjing
 DSA ground Kakching

See also 
 List of populated places in Thoubal district

References

External links

 Thoubal District website

 
Districts of Manipur
Minority Concentrated Districts in India
1983 establishments in Manipur